Jennipher Antoni (born 6 April 1976) is a German actress.

Life 
Jennipher (Jenny) Antoni is the daughter of Antoni Malte (1944–1988) and actress Carmen-Maja Antoni (born 1945).  She studied Japanese and Russian at the Humboldt University in Berlin. After Frank Beyer employed her for her first film work, she received an ongoing series role in the popular German TV series Unser Lehrer Doktor Specht.  She studied at the Konrad Wolff Hochschule für Film und Fernsehen in Potsdam.  At the same time, she worked in film and television with Martin Benrath, Robert Atzorn, Thekla Carola Wied, Jenny Gröllmann, and Jaecki Schwarz.

By 2008 she was a member of the Hans Otto Theater Potsdam under the Lauffenbergs including Katharina Thalbach, Dieter Mann, Winfried Glatzeder, Angelica Domröse and Desiree Nick in leading roles on-stage.

Since 2008 she has worked as a freelance actress.  She speaks English, Russian, Italian, and Japanese.

Films and TV
 (1992)
Unser Lehrer Doktor Specht (1993–1995) (throughout)
Frauenarzt Dr. Markus Merthin (1994)
Die Stadtindianer (1994)
Kanzlei Bürger (1994)
Wolffs Revier (1995)
Nana (1995)
Guten Morgen, Mallorca (1995)
: Herberge für einen Frühling (1995)
Ein Bernhardiner namens Möpschen (1996)
Für alle Fälle Stefanie (1996)
Freiwild (1997)
Der Landarzt (1998)
Dr. Marlene (1998)
Anna Marx (1998–1999) (throughout)
Wolffs Revier (1998)
Die Cleveren (1998)
Medicopter 117 – Jedes Leben zählt (1999)
Natascha (1999)
The Legend of Rita (1999)
Die Anstalt (2002) (throughout)
Kino Lichter (2003)
Kanzleramt (2004) (throughout)
Abschnitt 40 (2004)
Siska (2005)
Großstadtrevier (2005)
Zehn Gebote (2005)
In aller Freundschaft (2006)
Allein unter Bauern (2006) (throughout)
Die Rettungsflieger (2006)
Leipzig Homicide (2007)
Bei uns und um die Ecke (2008)
 Afire (2023)

Theatre
Since August 2008 Antoni has been a freelancer and guest at the Hans Otto Theater.  She also acted in London at the Theatre Festival—Political Acts of Resistance.

In Potsdam she played the following roles:
 1993: Biberpelz
 1995: Liebesbriefe an Hitler
 1995: Ich bin das Volk
 1998: Kirschgarten
 2004:	Romeo und Julia
 2004:	Krieg und Frieden
 2004:	Lina
 2004:	Der eingebildete Kranke
 2005:	Aladin Rolle: Prinzessin
 2005:	Herbertshof
 2005:	Dreigroschenoper
 2005:	Haus und Garten
 2005: Himmelsleiter
 2005:	Frau Jenny Treibel
 2006:	Raub der Sabinerinnen
 2006:	Am Ziel
 2006:	Katte
 2006:	David Salz
 2006:	Veronika beschliesst zu sterben
 2007:	Pünktchen u.Anton
 2007:	Die Möwe
 2007: Putin hat Geburtstag
 2007:	Fuck
 2007:	Leyla
 2008:	Der Zufriedene

Audio/Radio Plays, CDs
 1995: Randow n.C.Hein (Deutschlandradio)
 1995:	Die Welt vor 50 Jahren / Feature (Deutschlandradio)
 1996: Morgen sind wir in der Schweiz / Feature  (BR)
 1996: Massnahmen gegen den Hund (ORB)
 1997: Was nützt die Liebe in Gedanken (Deutschlandradio)
 1997: Louise Jakobson- ein jüdisches Schicksal in FRK / Feature (SFB)
 1998: Die rote Zora (CD Patmos)
 1998: Ich will keine Lady sein (CD Patmos)
 1998: Infoplankton / Feature (Deutschlandradio)
 1998: Bless my soul v.Lee Hall (SWR)
 1998: Das Wüten der ganzen Welt V:Marten Haart (Radio Bremen)
 2001: Die Kinder aus der 67.Strasse (CD Patmos)
 2001: Die Vaginamonologe (CD Patmos)
 2005: Stimmen aus der Wand (WDR)
 2006: Frankenstein in Hiroshima / Feature (WDR)
 2007: Nothing to know but coffee to go (Deutschlandradio)
 2007: Die Playmos (CD)
 2007: Willi will`s wissen (CD)
 2007: Lümmel (CD)
 2008: Die Pogrom-Nächte von Hassi Messaoud / Feature (RBB)
 2008: Herr Ombuwesi lernt tanzen (Berliner Hörspiele)
 2009: No und Ich (Hörbuch Steinbach)

Other Parts
 2005: Monk (Hermes Synchron)
 2005: Kommissar Wallner
 2005: Over there (Cinephon)
 2005: Bibi und Toni (Kiddinx)
 2005: Kommissar Wallner (Taunus)
 2006: Gilmore Girls (Blackbird Music)
 2006: CSI N.Y. (Interopa)
 2006: Mastermind Svaga (Taunus )
 2008: The Hottie and the Nottie DVD (VSI Synchron)

Awards and nominations
Antoni has received the following awards and nominations:
 1999:	Nominated for the Hessischen Rundfunk for the role of Eva in the film Natascha
 2002:	Lilly Schizophrenia Award 2002 for the television series Die Anstalt
 2007:	Nominated for the Friedrich Luft Prize at the Hans-Otto Theater in Potsdam for her role in Fuck by S. Weber

External links
Translator's note: These are in German.
 
 
 Jennipher Antoni at the Medienconnection Agency
 Jennipher Antoni at the Hans Otto Theater Potsdam

1976 births
Living people
Humboldt University of Berlin alumni
German film actresses
German television actresses
German stage actresses